Charles Edward Cawley (1812 – 9 April 1877) was a British civil engineer and Conservative Party politician.

He was the only son of Samuel Cawley of Goodden House, Middleton, Lancashire and his wife Mary Jones of Packington, Warwickshire. He became involved in Conservative politics and was for many years was an alderman on Salford Borough Council. In 1842 he married Harriet Motley.

Under the Representation of the People Act 1867 the parliamentary borough of Salford was given a second Member of Parliament, and Cawley was elected at the 1868 general election by a small majority. He comfortably retained his seat at the 1874 general election.

Charles Cawley died at his residence in Higher Broughton, near Manchester, in April 1877 aged 64.

References

Death of Mr Cawley M.P., The Times 4 April 1877, p. 10

External links 
 

1812 births
1877 deaths
Conservative Party (UK) MPs for English constituencies
UK MPs 1868–1874
UK MPs 1874–1880
Members of the Parliament of the United Kingdom for Salford